Otbah may refer to:

Otbah, from the tale Otbah and Rayya from The Book of One Thousand and One Nights
Otbah, character from Chu Chin Chow, based on Arabian Nights
Otbah (crater), named after the character from The Book of One Thousand and One Nights